"Is It a Sin" is a song by British electronic music group Deepest Blue. It was released on 24 May 2004 as the third single from their debut album, Late September (2004). The song reached number 24 on the UK Singles Chart and number 44 in Ireland.

The track shares a common echoed guitar riff with U2, which can be found prominently in U2's "Where the Streets Have No Name" and other U2 songs.

Track listings
CD1
 "Is It a Sin" (original mix)
 "Is It a Sin" (Antillas radio edit)

CD2
 "Is It a Sin" (album version)
 "Late September"
 "Give It Away" (Soulside Remix)
 "Is It a Sin" (video)

Charts

References

2004 singles
2004 songs
Data Records singles
Deepest Blue songs
Ministry of Sound singles
Songs written by Matt Schwartz